During the 1993–94 season, SV Werder Bremen played in the Bundesliga, the highest tier of the German football league system.

Season summary
Werder Bremen failed to retain their Bundesliga title, finishing in eighth position. They also failed to make a splash in the Champions League, with a 1–1 draw against eventual champions Milan in the group stage being cancelled out by a 5–0 home thrashing by Porto. However, they did win the DFB-Pokal by defeating Rot-Weiss Essen, making it four seasons in a row with silverware for the club.

First team squad
Squad at end of season

Transfers

In
  Mario Basler -  Hertha BSC

Out
  Chad Deering -  FC Schalke 04
  Klaus Allofs - retired
  Stefan Kohn -  1. FC Köln

References

Notes

External links

SV Werder Bremen seasons
SV Werder Bremen